PA18 may refer to:
 Pennsylvania Route 18
 Pennsylvania's 18th congressional district
 Pitcairn PA-18, an autogyro produced in 1932
 Piper PA-18, a light aircraft first produced in 1949